The End of Time may refer to:

Film and TV
 The End of Time (2012 film), a 2012 Swiss-Canadian documentary
 The End of Time (2017 film)
 "The End of Time" (Doctor Who), a double episode of the Doctor Who television series.
 The End of Time, a three episode season finale in Power Rangers Time Force

Music
 "End of Time" (song), by Beyoncé Knowles
 "End of Time", a song by Gotthard from Homerun
 "End of Time", a song by Lindsey Buckingham from Seeds We Sow
 "End of Time", a song by Lacuna Coil from Dark Adrenaline
 "End of Time", a song by Motorhead from Aftershock
 "End of Time", a song by The Band Perry from Pioneer
 Quatuor pour la fin du temps (Quartet for the End of Time), composed by Olivier Messiaen
 "End of Time", (K-391 song) a song by Alan Walker, K-391 and Ahrix

Other uses
 The End of Time (book), 1999, non-fiction by Julian Barbour arguing that time is an illusion
 Ultimate fate of the universe, various scientific theories about the end of time in the universe

See also
 End time (disambiguation)
 Year 2038 problem
 End of the world (disambiguation)
 Chrono Trigger